Divya Jyoti Higher Secondary School is a public school located in the Nawalparasi district of Nepal.

References

Schools in Nepal
1977 establishments in Nepal